Nelson John Meers AO (born 1938) was Lord Mayor of Sydney between 1978 and 1980.   He holds a degree in law from the University of Sydney.

Elected in 1974 as an Alderman of the City of Sydney, Meers served in successive years as Chairman of Properties, Chairman of Works and Deputy Lord Mayor. Prior to his own term as Lord Mayor (which began upon the sudden death of incumbent Leo Port), Meers established an extensive commercial and defamation practice as a partner of two leading international law firms. Meers is also a past President of the Civic Reform Association. He stepped down from the mayoralty in 1980; Doug Sutherland succeeded him.

In 2001 Meers, to formalise his personal tradition of philanthropic giving, founded the Nelson Meers Foundation.  The Nelson Meers Foundation was the first ‘Prescribed Private Fund’ to commence operation in Australia. Four years later, the Foundation won the Goldman Sachs JBWere Artsupport Australia Philanthropy Leadership Award.
 
Meers is married with four children and eight grandchildren, and still lives in Sydney. His daughter Samantha Meers is the chief executive officer of the Nelson Meers Foundation.

Nelson Meers Group is a large hotel group based in Sydney with a portfolio of some of Sydney’s largest hotels including the second most profitable hotel for pokies, the Ambulance Station Hotel in Auburn. Family patriarch Nelson Meers bought his first hotel in 1987 after card machines were allowed into pubs and told the Daily Telegraph in 2004 he would have bought more if he had known poker machines were on the horizon.

References

1938 births
Living people
Mayors and Lord Mayors of Sydney
Civic Reform Association politicians
Officers of the Order of Australia
Deputy Lord Mayors of Sydney